Asselfingen is a municipality in the district of Alb-Donau in Baden-Württemberg in Germany.

Mayors
 1986–2002: Georg Unseld
 2002–present: Armin Bollinger
Armin Bollinger was reelected in November 2009 and in December 2017.

References

Alb-Donau-Kreis
Württemberg